A displaced person is a person subject to forced displacement.

Displaced person or displaced persons may also refer to:
Displaced Person (American Playhouse), a 1985 episode of American anthology television series American Playhouse based on the short story "D.P." by Kurt Vonnegut
"The Displaced Person", a novella by Flannery O'Connor
Displaced Persons (film), a 1985 Australian TV movie about refugees arriving in Australia in 1945
Internally displaced person

See also